Thomas Wrede (born 1963) is a German photographer.

Life and work
Wrede was born in Iserlohn-Letmathe. He studied art at the Academy of Fine Arts in Münster from 1985 to 1991, Germany, where he also taught some years later. In 1991 he was the student of Dieter Appelt in Salzburg and Berlin.

He has been included in many exhibitions such as Strange Paradise at Städtische Galerie Iserlohn, 2005; Seascapes. Am Meer at Goethe-Institut London and in Helsinki, 2006; Tamed Nature at Brandenburgische Kunstsammlungen, 2005, in Germany; Really True! The Assurance of Reality in Photography at Ruhrlandmuseum Essen, 2004, in Germany; and the Paradise of the Modern at Bauhaus Dessau in Germany. In 2007 he exhibited Real Landscapes at Galerie Herrmann & Wagner, Berlin and Von Oben und von Unten, at Akademie Franz Hitze Haus, Münster.

A number of catalogues have been published about Wrede: Strange Paradise (2005), Magic Worlds (2000),  Birds Hang in the Air and Crey (1996), Samsoe (1994) and Places and Constellations (1993).

Style
It is our relation to nature that interests Wrede: Our longing for nature and the medialized description thereof. With his camera he observes how artificial nature is received in the same way as real nature. This subject matter is well known in German philosophy. Philosophers such as Immanuel Kant and Friedrich Hegel studied the dialectic relation to nature. Wrede thereby continues this German tradition as a photographer, questioning our perception of nature. 

Wrede's Real landscapes series are manipulations of landscapes. By adding artificial details into real nature he creates a staged scene that looks authentic at first. For the observer it becomes difficult to see what is actually real and what is unreal. The resemblance to model construction kits is striking. In effect he creates dreamlike scenes of nature or perhaps even nightmares.

External links
 Thomas Wrede's website
 Thomas Wrede at Galerie WAGNER + PARTNER
 Article about Thomas Wrede
 Thomas Wrede - Galerie f 5,6
  Thomas Wrede artist bio and exhibitions

Photographers from North Rhine-Westphalia
1963 births
Living people
People from Iserlohn